Ricardo Antonio García Rodríguez also known as  Sardina  (31 July 1955 – 12 December 2007) was a Costa Rican professional footballer who played his entire career for Municipal Puntarenas.

Club career
García won the 1986 Primera Division de Costa Rica title alongside players like Leonidas Flores and Luis Galagarza with hometown club Puntarenas. He alo won the second division title with them in 1976 and retired in 1989.

International career
He also made 17 appearances for the full Costa Rica national football team. He also played at the 1980 Olympic Games.

Personal life and death
García's son, also named Ricardo (Garciá Carvajal), is a professional footballer who plays for Puntarenas

García committed suicide in the El Roble district of Puntarenas on 12 December 2007.

References

1955 births
2007 deaths
People from Puntarenas Province
Association football defenders
Costa Rican footballers
Costa Rica international footballers
Olympic footballers of Costa Rica
Footballers at the 1980 Summer Olympics
Puntarenas F.C. players
Suicides in Costa Rica
2007 suicides